Solonka is a rural locality (a selo) and the administrative center of Solonskoye Rural Settlement, Nekhayevsky District, Volgograd Oblast, Russia. The population was 1,064 as of 2010. There are 17 streets.

Geography 
Solonka is located on Kalach Upland, 46 km southwest of Nekhayevskaya (the district's administrative centre) by road. Kamensky is the nearest rural locality.

References 

Rural localities in Nekhayevsky District